Eckington is a civil parish in the North East Derbyshire district of Derbyshire, England. The parish contains 81 listed buildings that are recorded in the National Heritage List for England. Of these, two are listed at Grade I, the highest of the three grades, two are at Grade II*, the middle grade, and the others are at Grade II, the lowest grade. The parish contains the town of Eckington, the villages of Renishaw, Ridgeway, and Spinkhill, the hamlet of Birley Hay, and the surrounding countryside.  The major building in the parish is the country house, Renishaw Hall, which is listed, together with associated structures and items in its grounds. Most of the other listed buildings are houses, cottages and associated structures, farmhouses and farm buildings.  The rest of the listed buildings include churches, chapels and associated items, a former Sunday school, a former toll house, a public house, and two bridges.


Key

Buildings

References

Citations

Sources

 

Lists of listed buildings in Derbyshire